Mark Kleinschmidt may refer to:

 Mark Kleinschmidt (politician) (born 1970), mayor of Chapel Hill, North Carolina
 Mark Kleinschmidt (rower) (born 1974), German rower